Eric Martel (born 29 April 2002) is a German professional footballer who plays as a centre-back and defensive midfielder for Bundesliga club 1. FC Köln.

Career
Martel made his professional debut for RB Leipzig in the second round of the 2020–21 DFB-Pokal on 22 December 2020, coming on as a substitute in the 88th minute for Dayot Upamecano against Bundesliga side FC Augsburg. The away match finished as a 3–0 win.

On 24 June 2022, it was announced that Martel would transfer to 1. FC Köln, where he signed a four-year deal.

References

External links
 
 
 
 

2002 births
Living people
People from Straubing
Sportspeople from Lower Bavaria
German footballers
Footballers from Bavaria
Association football central defenders
Germany under-21 international footballers
Germany youth international footballers
Austrian Football Bundesliga players
RB Leipzig players
FK Austria Wien players
1. FC Köln players